The side-striped barb or black-lined barb (Systomus pleurotaenia) is a species of cyprinid fish endemic to Sri Lanka where it occurs in the catchment of the Kelani and Nilwala Rivers. This species can reach a length of  TL. It is of minor importance to local commercial fisheries and can also be found in the aquarium trade.

References

Systomus
Taxonomy articles created by Polbot